Filipe Ferraz (born ) is a former Brazilian male volleyball player. With his club Sada Cruzeiro he competed at the 2012 FIVB Volleyball Men's Club World Championship.

Sporting achievements
As player

Clubs
 1999–00  Brazilian Superliga, with Minas Tênis Clube
 2004–05  Brazilian Superliga, with E.C. Banespa
 2011–12  Brazilian Superliga, with Sada Cruzeiro
 2013–14  Brazilian Superliga, with Sada Cruzeiro
 2014–15  Brazilian Superliga, with Sada Cruzeiro
 2015–16  Brazilian Superliga, with Sada Cruzeiro
 2016–17  Brazilian Superliga, with Sada Cruzeiro
 2017–18  Brazilian Superliga, with Sada Cruzeiro

South American Club Championship
  2012 – with Sada Cruzeiro
  2014 – with Sada Cruzeiro
  2015 – with Sada Cruzeiro
  2016 – with Sada Cruzeiro
  2017 – with Sada Cruzeiro
  2018 – with Sada Cruzeiro
  2019 – with Sada Cruzeiro
  2020 – with Sada Cruzeiro

FIVB Club World Championship
  2012 – with Sada Cruzeiro
  2013 – with Sada Cruzeiro
  2015 – with Sada Cruzeiro
  2016 – with Sada Cruzeiro
  2017 – with Sada Cruzeiro
  2019 – with Sada Cruzeiro

Individual
 2012 Brazilian Superliga – Best Receiver
 2016 Brazilian Superliga – Best Receiver

As Coach

FIVB Club World Championship
  2021 – with Sada Cruzeiro
  2022 – with Sada Cruzeiro

References

External links
 profile at FIVB.org

1980 births
Living people
Brazilian men's volleyball players